Dub Obscura is a remix album released in 1999 by New Zealand electronica duo, Pitch Black.

Track listing
"Pitch Black - Melt"
"International Observer - Speech (White Amplitude Mix)"
"The Submariner - Soliton (Ton A' Sol Mix)"
"Epsilon Blue - Speech (Freedom of Speech Mix)"
"AKC Design - Melt (Mr Babbit Mix)"
"Epsilon Blue - Speech (Speechless Mix)"

Pitch Black (band) albums
1999 remix albums